The Communal Chambers were two parallel legislative bodies in Cyprus; one for the Greek Cypriot community and one for the Turkish Cypriot community. The Greek Chamber was abolished in 1965.

History
The Chambers were established under the 1960 constitution, with the first elections held on 7 August 1960. The Patriotic Front won a large majority in the Greek chamber and the Cyprus Turkish National Union won all the seats in the Turkish chamber.

Following the withdrawal of the Turkish community from national politics in December 1963, in March 1965 the remaining Greek members of the House of Representatives passed a law abolishing the Greek Communal Chamber and transferring its responsibilities to the House of Representatives. A new Ministry of Education and Culture was established to take responsibility for educational and cultural issues.

In 1967 members of the Turkish chamber joined with the 15 Turkish former members of the House of Representatives to establish a new Turkish Cypriot Legislative Assembly. The chamber was never officially dissolved, although its powers have not been exercised in the Republic of Cyprus since the 1974 division of the island.

Powers
Article 87 of the constitution outlined the responsibilities of the chambers:

References

Historical legislatures
Politics of Cyprus
1960 establishments in Cyprus
1965 disestablishments in Cyprus